Gilyovka is a rural locality (a selo) and the administrative center of Gilyovsky Selsoviet of Zavyalovsky District, Altai Krai, Russia. The population was 1232 as of 2016. There are 19 streets.

Geography 
Gilyovka is located 22 km northeast of Zavyalovo (the district's administrative centre) by road. Dobraya Volya is the nearest rural locality.

References 

Rural localities in Zavyalovsky District, Altai Krai